The 2014 Belarusian Athletics Championships was the national championship in outdoor track and field for Belarus. It was held from 24–26 July at Neman Stadium in Grodno.

Results

Men

Women

References

Results
 Пратаколы Чэмпіяната

Belarusian Athletics Championships
Belarusian Athletics Championships
Belarusian Athletics Championships
Belarusian Athletics Championships
Sport in Grodno